Pristimantis vanadise, also known as La Marca's robber frog or blue cloudy frog, is a species of frog in the family Strabomantidae.

It is endemic to Venezuela. Its natural habitat is tropical moist montane forests.

Sources

vanadise
Endemic fauna of Venezuela
Amphibians of Venezuela
Amphibians of the Andes
Amphibians described in 1984
Taxonomy articles created by Polbot